
The U.S. state of Alabama is served by six area codes. When the North American Numbering Plan was first defined in 1947, Alabama was a single numbering plan area (NPA), with area code 205. This configuration existed until 1995 when area code 334 was added for the southeastern part of the state. In 1998, area code 256 was assigned for northern Alabama. It had an overlay area code 938 added in 2010, which required ten-digit dialing. The area code 251 in south Alabama was added in 2001. Area code 659 was installed in 2019, after having been proposed in 2001.

References

External links

 
Lists of United States area codes
Area codes
Area codes